The Haitinger Prize of the Austrian Academy of Sciences was founded in 1904 by the chemist and factory director, Ludwig Camillo Haitinger (1860–1945), who created the award in honor of his father, Karl Ludwig Haitinger. From 1905 to 1943 it was awarded every year, for "studies in chemistry and physics that proved to be of great practical use for industrial applications". The prize was awarded for the last time in the year 1954.

Winners
1905 Friedrich Hasenöhrl for electromagnetic theory
1906 F. Ratz 
Rudolf Scheuble for candles which burn in color 
1907 Robert Kremann for research on esters
1908 Marian Smoluchowski for theoretical investigation of Brownian motion 
1909 F. Haiser
F. Wenzel
1910 Anton Skrabal for research on kinetic reactions of potassium permanganate 
1911 Gustav Jaumann for authoring the corotational rates known as “Jaumann derivatives”
1912 Albert Defant for atmospheric physics and weather research 
Wilhelm Schmidt for research on microclimatology
1913 Franz Faltis for research on opiates, particularly morphine 
Otto Hönigschmid for measurement of atomic mass
1914 Karl Przibram for studies on the electrical charge of fog particles
1915 Heinrich Mache for absolute measurement method of radioactivity
1916 Emil Abel for catalysis research
1917 Felix Ehrenhaft for photophoresis and effects on the interaction of light with particles 
1918 Wolfgang Joseph Pauli (the father of the Nobel laureate Wolfgang Ernst Pauli) for his research on the chemistry of colloids.
1919 Max Bamberger 
Julius Zellner
1920 Erwin Schrödinger for fundamentals of color theory 
Hans Thirring for studies on general relativity
1921 Alfons Klemenc for studies on electrochemistry
1922 Alois Zinke for condensed ring systems 
Anton Kailan for research on radium and ultraviolet radiation
1923 Adolph Smekal for research on quantum theory of dispersion
1924 Franz Aigner for underwater sound navigation
Gerhard Kirsch for research on nuclear physics and geologic time measurement
1925 Robert Kremann for the discovery of electrolyte effect of alloys
Ludwig Moser for quantitative rules for metals
1926 Georg Stetter for using electronics to measure the energy of nuclear particles
1927 Moritz Kohn for organic chemistry
J. Lindner for organic chemistry
1928 Karl Wilhelm Friedrich Kohlrausch for the law of independent migration of ions
1929 Fritz Feigel for his techniques in analytical chemistry
L. Schmid for organic chemistry
1931 Ewald Schmidt for research on radioactivity
1932 Otto Redlich for research on the properties of water and aqueous solutions
1933 Elizabeth Rona for her method of extracting polonium 
Berta Karlik for her work on luminescence 
1935 Joseph Mattauch for development of the Mattauch isobar rule
1936 Otto Kratky for studies on colloidal particles
1937 Marietta Blau and Hertha Wambacher for the identification of alpha-particles and protons
1939 Herbert Haberlandt for luminescence of fluorites
1947 Berta Karlik for her discovery of Astatine

See also

 List of chemistry awards
 List of physics awards

References

Sources 

Awards established in 1904
Organisations based in Vienna
Austrian Academy of Sciences
Chemistry awards
Physics awards
1904 establishments in Austria-Hungary